Citrinophila erastus, the large yellow, is a butterfly in the family Lycaenidae. It is found in Liberia, Ivory Coast, Ghana, Togo, Nigeria, Cameroon, Equatorial Guinea, Gabon, the Republic of the Congo, the Central African Republic, the Democratic Republic of the Congo, Uganda, and Tanzania. Its habitat consists of lowland forests.

Subspecies
Citrinophila erastus erastus (Liberia, Ivory Coast, Ghana, Togo, Nigeria, Cameroon, Equatorial Guinea: Bioko, Gabon, Congo, Central African Republic, Democratic Republic of the Congo: Mongala, Uele, Tshopo, Tshuapa, Equateur, Kinshasa, Kasai and Sankuru)
Citrinophila erastus pallida Hawker-Smith, 1933 (Democratic Republic of the Congo: east and Shaba, Uganda, Tanzania)

References

Butterflies described in 1866
Poritiinae
Taxa named by William Chapman Hewitson
Butterflies of Africa